The Definitive Collection  is a compilation album by Humble Pie, released in 2006. It features tracks from all eight Humble Pie studio albums from the years 1969 to 1975, as well as tracks from the live album Performance Rockin' the Fillmore.

Track listing
"Natural Born Woman (aka Natural Born Boogie)" single that was released to promote As Safe As Yesterday Is
"The Sad Bag of Shaky Jake" from Town and Country
"Big Black Dog" single only release 
"Live With Me" from Humble Pie
"I'm Ready" from Humble Pie
"Shine On" from Rock On
"Stone Cold Fever" from Rock On
"Rollin' Stone" from Rock On
"Four Day Creep" (Live) from Performance Rockin' the Fillmore
"I Don't Need No Doctor" (Live) from Performance Rockin' the Fillmore
"Hot 'n' Nasty" from Smokin'
"C'mon Everybody" from Smokin'''
"30 Days in the Hole" from Smokin'"Black Coffee" from Eat It"I Believe To My Soul" from Eat It"Ninety-Nine Pounds" from Thunderbox"Road Hog" from Street Rats''

References

Humble Pie (band) albums
2006 compilation albums
A&M Records compilation albums